In tennis, the 2017 Australian Open Series, (sometimes known as the 'Australian Summer of Tennis' which includes a group of hard court tournaments that starts on January 1, 2017 and concludes with the men's singles final at the Australian Open on January 29, 2017.

Tournament Schedule

Week 1

Hopman Cup

Final

France vs. United States

ATP – Brisbane International

Finals

WTA – Brisbane International

Victoria Azarenka was the defending champion, but did not participate due to pregnancy.

Finals

Week 2

ATP – Apia International (Sydney)

Viktor Troicki was the two-time defending champion, but lost in the semifinals to Gilles Müller.

Müller went on to win his first ATP title, defeating Daniel Evans in the final, 7–6(7–5), 6–2.

Finals

WTA – Apia International (Sydney)

Main Draw Finals

WTA – Hobart International 

Alizé Cornet was the defending champion, but withdrew before the tournament began due to a back injury.

Elise Mertens won her first WTA singles title, defeating Monica Niculescu in the final, 6–3, 6–1. Mertens had come through the qualifying tournament and thus became only the third qualifier to win the Hobart International, following Mona Barthel in 2012 and Garbiñe Muguruza in 2014.

Finals

Week 3-4

ATP – Australian Open (Melbourne)

Novak Djokovic was the two-time defending champion, but lost in the second round to the 117th ranked Denis Istomin from Uzbekistan.

Roger Federer won his fifth Australian Open title, and 18th Major title overall, defeating Rafael Nadal in the final in five sets. With the win, Federer became the first male player to win at least five titles at three Grand Slam tournaments (five at the Australian Open, seven at Wimbledon and five at the US Open).

This was the first Grand Slam tournament in which Andy Murray started as World No. 1 and top seed. Murray retained the top ranking despite losing to Mischa Zverev in the fourth round.

Main Draw Finals

Finals

WTA – Australian Open (Melbourne)

Angelique Kerber was the defending champion, but lost in the fourth round to Coco Vandeweghe.

Serena Williams won the title, her 7th Australian title overall and first Australian Open where she did not lose a set during the tournament. She also regained the No. 1 ranking, defeating her sister Venus Williams in the final, 6–4, 6–4. This marks the first time the Williams sisters met in a Grand Slam final since the 2009 Wimbledon Championships and the first time they met in the Australian Open final since 2003.
 
Serena's victory was her 23rd Grand Slam title in singles, surpassing Steffi Graf as the all-time leader in Grand Slam titles in the Open era.

Main Draw Finals

Finals

References

External links
 

 Series